Léonie Juliana, Baroness Cooreman (16 June 1928 – 4 September 2020), also known by her stage name Annie Cordy, was a Belgian actress and singer. She appeared in more than 50 films from 1954 and staged many memorable appearances at Bruno Coquatrix' famous Paris Olympia. Her version of "La Ballade de Davy Crockett" was number 1 in the charts for five weeks in France in August 1956. She was born in Laeken, Belgium, where in 2004, King Albert II of Belgium bestowed upon her the title of Baroness in recognition for her life's achievements.

Early life
Cordy was born in Laeken, Belgium, the daughter of Maria de Leeuw and Cornelius January Cooreman. She had a brother, Louis, and a sister, Jeanne.

At the age of eight, her mother enrolled her in a dance class. She learnt piano and music theory, while pursuing her studies, and participated in charity galas. Between the dance numbers, she sang the hits of the day. Artistic director of Le Lido encouraged her to leave Brussels, her hometown, and Annie Cordy arrived in Paris on 1 May 1950, to be hired as a lead dancer.

1952–1960
Cordy recorded her first songs in 1952 ("Les Trois Bandits de Napoli", "Quand c'est aux autos de passer", "La bourrée d'Auvergne montagnarde") and made her debut in the musical, "La Route fleurie", alongside Georges Guétary and Bourvil. This lasted until 1955.

Then she made her film debut in 1953 when she appeared as herself in Boum sur Paris, next to Jacques Pills and Armand Bernard. That same year, she had her first hit record with "Bonbons, caramels, esquimaux, chocolats" or "Léon".

In 1954 she starred in April Fools' Day as Charlotte Dupuy, alongside her friend Bourvil, Louis de Funès, Denise Grey, and Maurice Biraud. The film was a big success with almost three million ticket sales. She also played Madame Langlois in Sacha Guitry's Royal Affairs in Versailles, with  Michel Auclair,  Jean-Pierre Aumont, Jean-Louis Barrault, Bourvil, Gino Cervi, Claudette Colbert, Nicole Courcel, Daniel Gélin, Jean Marais, Gisèle Pascal, Édith Piaf, Gérard Philipe, Micheline Presle, Tino Rossi, Orson Welles, and Nicole Maurey. The film was the #1 movie in France in 1954. It is still one of the 100 most successful films at the French box office of all time, the 89th highest grossing title.

In 1955 her song "Fleur de Papillon" became a hit. She also starred in two motion pictures. First, Hello Smile ! directed by Claude Sautet, with Henri Salvador, Louis de Funès, Darry Cowl and Jean Carmet and an Italian comedy, Beautiful but Dangerous, in which she just made a short appearance.

In 1956 she starred as Cri-Cri in Le Chanteur de Mexico, directed by Richard Pottier, with Luis Mariano, Bourvil, and Fernando Rey. The film was again a big success, with almost 5,000,000 tickets sold, and it was #5 at the box office for 1956 and #247 of all time in France.  At the same time she had a hit on the song charts with the French version of The Ballad of Davy Crockett, which stayed at number 1 for 5 weeks in France in August 1956.

In 1957 she played Titine in a West German remake of Victor and Victoria, directed by Karl Anton. That same year, she starred in her second musical, "Tête de linotte" with Jean Richard which lasted until 1960.

In 1958 she had other musical hits, such as "Hello le soleil brille" from the movie The Bridge on the River Kwai or "Docteur miracle". She returned to Tabarin, where she played Mimi under the direction of Richard Pottier for the second time. This was the leading role, and she starred alongside Michel Piccoli, Sylvia Lopez, Mischa Auer, Germaine Damar, Jean Lefebvre, and Isabelle Corey.

In 1959 she had several musical successes, including her version of "Petite Fleur", "Salade de fruits" or "Cigarettes, Whisky et P'tites Pépées" from the movie with the same name. She starred in this movie, with Pierre Mondy, Nadine de Rothschild, Jean Carmet, Jean Richard, and Franco Interlenghi.

In 1960 she played in Robert Vernay's "Tête folle, alongside Jean Richard.

1961–1970

From 1961 to 1964 Cordy starred in her third musical, opposite Luis Mariano, named "Visa pour l'amour" featuring the hit "Visa pour l'amour".

In 1964 she sang the hit song "Six Roses".

From 1965 to 1967, she had the leading female part in "Ouah ! Ouah !", another musical with Bourvil. This musical featured the hit "Le p'tit coup de chance".  At the same time, back in cinema, she played Lily in Ces dames s'en mêlent, directed by Raoul André, with Eddie Constantine and Nino Ferrer. She also made a cameo in "L'or du duc" directed by Jacques Baratier, with Claude Rich, Danielle Darrieux, Elsa Martinelli, Pierre Brasseur, Jean Richard, and Charles Trenet.

In 1967, she played Maryse in "Ces messieurs de la famille", directed by Raoul André, with Francis Blanche, Michel Serrault, Darry Cowl, Jean Poiret, Jean Yanne, Michel Galabru, and Eddie Constantine.

In 1968 she starred in "Pic et Pioche", a musical with her friend Darry Cowl.

In 1969 she played Mme Marthe in "Le bourgeois gentil mec". It was the third time that she was directed by Raoul André, and the movie also stars; Jean Lefebvre, Darry Cowl, Francis Blanche, and Bella Darvi.

The 1970 year was very successful for Cordy, she worked for the fourth time with Raoul André in the movie "Ces messieurs de la gâchette", a sequel of "Ces messieurs de la famille". She signed on for her role as Maryse, and the movie also featured, Francis Blanche, Jean Poiret, Michel Serrault, Darry Cowl, Micheline Dax, and Patrice Laffont.  She also played for René Clément, the role of Juliette in Rider on the Rain, alongside Marlène Jobert, Charles Bronson, Jill Ireland, and Gabriele Tinti. The movie was a big success, it was the #3 movie at the box-office in 1970, in France.  Also that year, she was also directed by Claude Chabrol as Mme. Pinelli in The Breach. She starred alongside Stéphane Audran, Jean-Pierre Cassel, Michel Bouquet and Jean Carmet.  On top of all of  her success in cinema, she also had a musical hit in the same anum, "Le Chouchou de mon Coeur"

1971–1980

In 1971, she played Nelly in Le Chat directed by Pierre Granier-Deferre. The film starred also Jean Gabin and Simone Signoret. The film was very well received with more than one million tickets sold. She also started, this same year a new musical, "Indien vaut mieux que deux tu l'auras", where she starred with Pierre Doris.

In 1972, she starred in the titular role of the French version of Hello, Dolly!. She also played Brigitte in "Les galets d'Étretat". The movie is directed by Sergio Gobbi and starred Virna Lisi. Then, she played Andrée in "Les portes de feu", alongside Emmanuelle Riva and Jacques Balutin.

In 1973, she played Nina in Tre per una grande rapina, with Michel Constantin and Adolfo Celi. She also played in "La dernière bourrée à Paris", in which she worked for the fifth time with the director Raoul André and starred alongside Francis Blanche, Roger Coggio, Micheline Dax, Michel Galabru, Marion Game, and Tony Kendall. She played in "Elle court, elle court la banlieue" directed by Gérard Pirès and starring Marthe Keller, Jacques Higelin, Robert Castel, Ginette Leclerc, Claude Piéplu, Alice Sapritch, Victor Lanoux, Daniel Prévost, Coluche, Diane Kurys, and Miou-Miou. The film was a success with more than a million and a half tickets sold.

In 1974, she released La bonne du curé. This song became a classic and is one of her greatest successes with more than two million worldwide. At the same time, she continued to make movies like "Les gaspards", directed by Pierre Tchernia and starring Michel Serrault, Philippe Noiret, Michel Galabru, Charles Denner, Gérard Depardieu, Chantal Goya, Roger Carel, Daniel Ivernel, Jean Carmet, and Gérard Hernandez.

In 1975, she starred in the leading role of Souvenir of Gibraltar, directed by Henri Xhonneux, also starring Eddie Constantine. In addition she played Isabelle's mother in "Isabelle devant le désir", starring Jean Rochefort, Anicée Alvina, and Mathieu Carrière. This same year, she also had several musical hits : "Ya kasiti", "Jane la tarzane", and one of her most famous hits, "Frida Oum Papa".

In 1976, she returned to a musicals in a production named "Nini la chance". In this undertaking she had the lead part and in what turned out to be a huge success. This musical produced a hit for Cordy with song with the musical's title for its name, Nini la Chance. Outside of Nini, Cordy, had other hits this same year with "La Bébête", "Dis pourquoi tu me bats Léon", and "Ca ira mieux demain", which became a cult favourite. She starred in High Street, a movie directed by André Ernotte in which she had the leading part. In this film she played alongside Mort Shuman and Elliot Tiber.

In 1977, she played the Baronne Jacinthe de la Tronchembiais, in the first and only movie directed by Guy Lux, Drôles de zèbres. The movie also starred Sim, Alice Sapritch, Patrick Préjean, Raymond Bussières, Katia Tchenko, Léon Zitrone, Petula Clark, Coluche, and Claude François. The director and writer Michel Audiard said about Cordy that he was sorry she had to sing crappy songs, because she did an impressive duet with Bourvil, he thought her a wonderful blues singer and a great actress and she deserved to sing a way better song.

In 1978, she released another musical hit which became a classic, "Qui qu'en veut". This same year, she made her first television movie. First, she played in "Le bel indifférent" from Jean Cocteau's play, starring alongside Alain Delon. Then, she played ina television adaptation of Molière's The Miser. In this staging she played Frosine, alongside Henri Virlojeux and Paul Préboist.

In 1980, she had several musical successes, including; "Senorita Raspa", "La Coupe à Ratcha", "L'Artiste", and "Ma plus jolie chanson", but, her most successful title was "Tata Yoyo" which became another of her songs to develop a cult following.

1981–1990

In 1981, she played Mme Hortense in the TV Movie written by Didier Decoin, "Les fiançailles de feu", alongside Pierre Malet and Paul Le Person. She also played the leading role in the TV Movie "Madame Sans-Gêne", an adaptation of Victorien Sardou's play, in which she appeared with Raoul Billerey. This same year she made her stage drama debut with the same play, "Madame Sans-Gêne".

In 1982, she's apoeared in the final musical in which she had the leading part,  "Envoyez la musique". This same year on Television, she had her own TV Series, "Madame S.O.S.", it lasted one season. She played alongside Jean-Pierre Darras and Jeanne Herviale. The series's soundtrack, "Si j'étais le soleil", was sung by Cordy. She had also another musical success with "Nini Pompon".

In 1983, after six years of absence from the cinema, she returned with "Le braconnier de Dieu", directed by Jean-Pierre Darras, in which she played the leading female part. The movie also starred Pierre Mondy, Jean Lefebvre, Michel Galabru, Daniel Ceccaldi, Catherine Allégret, Rosy Varte, Odette Laure, Marthe Mercadier, Paul Préboist, and Roger Pierre. Meanwhile, Cordy experienced yet another musical success with the song "Le rock à Médor".

In 1985, she had another musical hit which became a cult favorite, Cho Ka Ka O.

In 1986, she appeared principally in Theater, with three plays in one year. First as Madame de Sévigné, in the play of the same name, in which she played the center role. Then, she played in "La Mienne s'appelait Régine" at the Théâtre de l'Œuvre. And finally, she played in "Merci Apolline", an original play.

In 1987, she resumed her role in the classic play "Madame Sans-Gene", that she had already played in 1981, on stage and in a TV Movie.

In 1989, she appeared in one episode of the French television Series, "Le bonheur d'en face", in which she played Irène Lecoin, in an episode directed by Teff Erhat. She also starred in the play "Mademoiselle Plume", in the leading role.

In 1990, she returned to cinema after a seven year break with the movie "Impasse de la vignette". In this film she played alongside; Paul Crauchet, Jean-Paul Comart, and Jean-Yves Berteloot. Her performance was praised by the critics and she won the Best Actress Award at the "Festivals de Digne". This same year, she had the leading role in the television Series "Orages d'été", in which she appeared during nine episodes, next to Gérard Klein, Claire Nebout, Jacques Dufilho, Pierre Vaneck, and Patachou. She also appeared on stage with the play "Sacrée Gladys", in which she had the leading role, next to Jacques Balutin.

1991–2000

While Cordy continued to give concerts and musical compilations were released with her past albums, she was more present on television as an actress.

After a two-year break, she was back in 1993, when she appeared in the TV Series "Inspecteur Médeuze", next to Francis Perrin, Christophe Bourseiller, Jacques Seiler, and Mouss Diouf.

1994, was a big year for her. First, she starred in the movie La Vengeance d'une blonde, directed by Jeannot Szwarc, and with Christian Clavier, Marie-Anne Chazel, Clémentine Célarié, Thierry Lhermitte, Marc de Jonge, Philippe Khorsand, Angelo Infanti, and Urbain Cancelier. It was a big success with more than two million tickets sales at the box office. It was the fourth most successful French film of the year 1994 in France, behind An indian in the city, Léon: The Professional, and La Cité de la peur. She played Bertoune, the central character, in the TV Movie "La fille du roi", which also stars Raoul Billerey. This same year, she appeared in two plays. First, "Six heures au plus tard" with Xavier Percy and then "La Célestine" with Gérard Chambre. In both plays, she played the lead character.

In 1995, she played in her first Short film, "Vroum-vroum", written by Eduardo Manet, in which she starred next to Michael Lonsdale, Claire Nebout, and Jean-Paul Comart. She played in one episode of the TV Series "Baldi", next to her friend Charles Aznavour. She also had the leading role in the TV Movie "Fanny se fait un sang d'encre". She also sang for the French soundtrack of Pocahontas, named "Ecoute ton coeur".

In 1996, she played in a Short called "Moi j'aime Albert", alongside André Pousse. She also played Hélène in an episode of "Le refuge", starring Maxime Leroux and direct by Alain Schwartzstein.

In 1997, she played in three TV Movies. First, "Le diable en sabots" from a novel by Claude Seignolle, in which she played Marie Fer, alongside Patrick Préjean. Then, she played the leading role in "Une mère comme on n'en fait plus", with Nathalie Boutefeu and Cécile Vassort. Finally, she played Solange Serpette in "Sans cérémonie", directed by Michel Lang, written by Claude d'Anna, and also starring Charles Aznavour and Caroline Vasicek.

In 1998, to mark her 50-year career, she gave a concert at the Olympia. Her friends Georges Moustaki, Guy Béart, Nicoletta, Benjamin Castaldi, Sim, Claude Piéplu, Michel Leeb, Laurent Gerra, Didier Gustin, and many others were present at the event.

In 1999, she played in the Short "Un Noël de chien", written and directed by Nadine Monfils, and also starring Jean-Claude Dreyfus.

In 2000, she appeared in a second episode of the TV Series "Baldi", in which she'd already played in 1995, still next to her friend Charles Aznavour. She was also back on stage with a play written by William Shakespeare : "Les Joyeuses Commères de Windsor" (The Merry Wives of Windsor). She acted in this play with Patrick Préjean. She has also participated in the series of concerts organized by Les Enfoirés, where shared the song "Une belle histoire" with Alain Souchon and Francis Cabrel.

2001–2020

In 2001, she starred in the TV Movie "La tortue", with Pascale Arbillot.

In 2002, she starred in two TV Movies. First, "Les rebelles de Moissac", with Françoise Bertin and Maurice Chevit, and then, "Passage du bac", with Charles Aznavour, Alexis Tomassian, Bernard Blancan, and Urbain Cancelier.

In 2003, Annie played Lucette, the central character in an episode of "Fabien Cosma", with Louis-Karim Nébati and Gérard Hernandez.

In 2004, she played in the Short film "Zartmo". She was also back in the motion picture "Madame Édouard", after ten years of having not appeared in any film. "Madame Édouard" also starred Michel Blanc, Didier Bourdon, Dominique Lavanant, Josiane Balasko, Rufus, Andréa Ferréol, and Bouli Lanners. For her role in "Les Femmes de Cristal", she received the Woman Crystal Award in the category "Cinema and Theatre".

In 2005, she appeared in an episode of "Le tuteur", with Tony D'Amario.

In 2006, Cordy played Rose, the leading female character in the movie "Le Dernier des fous". The movie is based on the novel "The Last of The Crazy People" written by Timothy Findley. She was in the movie with Dominique Reymond. She also starred in "C'est beau une ville la nuit", directed by Richard Bohringer, and also featuring; Romane Bohringer, Robinson Stévenin, Luc Thuillier, Jacques Spiesser, Farid Chopel, Daniel Duval, Annie Girardot, Sonia Rolland, Christian Morin, and Paul Personne. She's also appeared on stage in "Lily & Lily", a play in which she had the leading part, with Christian Morin and Firmine Richard. She was also the narrator for the documentary, "Moi, Belgique" on RTBF, in which she related the history of her country, Belgium.

In 2008, she played Mme Graindorge in Disco, Fabien Onteniente's movie starring Emmanuelle Béart, Gérard Depardieu, Samuel Le Bihan, Isabelle Nanty, Chloé Lambert, Marie-Christine Adam, Pauline Delpech, Xavier Beauvois, and Danièle Lebrun. The film was a big success with more than two million ticket sold in France. It was the third most successful French movie in France in 2008, just behind Welcome to the Sticks and Asterix at the Olympic Games. This same year, she played in Le crime est notre affaire, directed by Pascal Thomas and based on the novel 4.50 from Paddington, written by Agatha Christie. The movie also starred Catherine Frot, André Dussollier, Claude Rich, Chiara Mastroianni, Melvil Poupaud, Christian Vadim, Hippolyte Girardot, and Yves Afonso. This was also a success with more than a million tickets sold in France. Also in 2008, the channel RTBF organised a special night for Annie, named "Quelque chose en nous d'Annie Cordy", in which a number of artists appeared to pay a tribute to her.

In 2009, she played in Wild Grass, a movie directed by Alain Resnais and starring Sabine Azéma, André Dussollier, Anne Consigny, Emmanuelle Devos, Mathieu Amalric, Michel Vuillermoz, Edouard Baer, Sara Forestier, Nicolas Duvauchelle, Paul Crauchet, and Jean-Michel Ribes. This same year, she started a new play, "Laissez-moi sortir", in which she was alone on the stage, playing the part of a great star who is locked out on her balcony and so talks and reminisces about her entire career. After the huge success of the play in 2009 she started a tour in the whole of France in 2010.

In 2011, she played in the low-budget movie "Crimes en sourdine" with Annick Alane, Ginette Garcin, and Patrick Préjean. The same year she was back in a studio with an original album : "Ca me plaît pourvu que ça vous plaise..." in which she sang songs written for her by artists such as Charles Aznavour or Alice Dona.
 
In 2012, she had the leading role in the TV Movie "Je retourne chez ma mère", starring also Rufus and Katia Tchenko. She also appeared in an episode of Scènes de ménage.

In 2013, she appeared in an episode of the TV Series "Y'a pas d'âge", broadcast on France 2, alongside Jérôme Commandeur, Marthe Villalonga, Claude Brasseur, Carmen Maura, and Arielle Dombasle.

In 2014, she played in Le Dernier Diamant, alongside Yvan Attal, Bérénice Bejo, Jean-François Stévenin, and Jacques Spiesser. She also appeared in an episode of "H-Man", a TV Series broadcast on Arte, alongside Arthur H. She also released a Christmas album for December with 30 jazz musicians named "Annie Cordy chante Noël".

In 2015, she was given the leading role in Les souvenirs, directed by Jean-Paul Rouve, and also starring Chantal Lauby and Michel Blanc. The movie was  a great success with over a million tickets sold.She also played in France 2's TV Series "Chefs", with a recurrent character, next to Hugo Becker, Anne Charrier, Clovis Cornillac, Juliette, Nicolas Gob, Robin Renucci, and Zinedine Soualem. She was involved in the album "Joyeux anniversaire M'sieur Dutronc" which paid tribute to Jacques Dutronc. This year, she also walked up the stairs to the 2015 Cannes Film Festival. She was also invited to the Festival du film francophone d'Angoulême for a tribute to Belgian Cinema where Impasse de la vignette and High Street were presented.

In 2016, she walked up the stairs to the 2016 Cannes Film Festival to see the movie The Unknown Girl before the movie Le Cancre was presented with the cast.

In July 2018, for her 90th birthday, she was the guest of honour of the Ommegang of Brussels. A couple of days after this event on August 8th, the park next to the train station in Laeken, city where she was born was named for her.

Death

On 4 September 2020, Cordy suffered cardiac arrest at her home in Vallauris, France, where she lived with her niece. Attempts to revive her were unsuccessful and she was pronounced dead. She was 92 years old.

In popular culture
Albert Uderzo gave Annie Cordy a cameo as the wife of the Belgian chieftain in the Asterix comic book story Asterix in Belgium.

Honours 
 2005: Baroness of Belgium.
 24 October 2013 : Commander of the Order of the Crown.
 2022: Léopold II Tunnel in Molenbeek-Saint-Jean renamed "Annie Cordy Tunnel"

Filmography

Dubbing

Box-office 

Movies starring Annie Cordy with more than a million entries in France.

Stage

Theater

Musicals

Discography

References

External links

1928 births
2020 deaths
People from Laeken
Belgian baronesses
20th-century Belgian women singers
20th-century Belgian singers
Belgian film actresses
Belgian voice actresses
Belgian comedy musicians
Belgian women comedians
Commanders of the Order of the Crown (Belgium)
CBS Records artists
X Records artists
Belgian television actresses
20th-century Belgian actresses
21st-century Belgian actresses
Walloon musicians